Karmageddon may refer to:

 Karmageddon Media, a former Dutch independent record label 
 Karmageddon, a periodic event organised by the Join Me movement
 Karmageddon, a 2009 album by Ravi Bissambhar
 "Karmageddon", a song by Soulfly on their self-titled debut album
 "Karmageddon", a song by Hank Williams III on his album Rebel Within
 "Karmageddon", a song by M.I.A. on her album Matangi

See also 
 Carmageddon (disambiguation)